Damián Emmanuel Lizio (born 30 June 1989) is an Argentine-born Bolivian footballer
who plays as an attacking midfielder for Real Santa Cruz.

Club career

River Plate
Born in Florida, Buenos Aires, Lizio came through the youth ranks of River Plate, making his official debut on 10 November 2007 against Huracán in a 2–1 away loss, playing the entire game. His second appearance for the team was in a 2–0 defeat against Banfield on 8 December. The next season, Lizio won the 2008 Clausura Tournament under Diego Simeone. It was his first professional title, despite not making an appearance in the competition.

After a season, he had more chances to play when Néstor Gorosito took over. He made his first appearance under Gorosito in a 2–0 away victory over Independiente at the Estadio Monumental Antonio Vespucio Liberti. His second appearance was when he came off the bench in the 82nd minute in place of Cristian Fabbiani, playing only eight minutes in the match.

Al-Arabi

On 30 June 2013, Lizio signed for Al-Arabi. He left after 3 months with the club.

O'Higgins

In 2014, Lizio joined Chilean side O'Higgins for the 2014-15 season.

Persebaya Surabaya

On 20 February 2019, Lizio is signed by Persebaya Surabaya for the 2019 season. He signed a one-year contract with the club.

Royal Pari
In January 2020, Lizio returned to Bolivia and joined Royal Pari.

International career

Argentina U-20
In January 2009 Lizio was selected to join the Argentina under-20 squad for the 2009 South American Youth Championship in Venezuela.

Bolivia
In 2014, Lizio accepted to play for Bolivia national team and made his debut in a non-unofficial FIFA friendly on 13 October against the Brazil under-23s at Cuiabá, where he scored his side's goal in a 3–1 defeat. On 18 November 2014, he scored his first goal in a 3–2 friendly home win over Venezuela.

International goal
Score and result list Bolivia's goal tally first.

Career statistics

Club

Honours

Club
River Plate
 Torneo Clausura (1): 2008

Bolívar
 Primera División (1): 2011

Al-Arabi
 Kuwait Federation Cup (1): 2013–14

Persebaya Surabaya
 Runner-up, Piala Presiden: 2019

References

External links

 Argentine Primera statistics
 
 Lizio at Football Lineups

1989 births
Living people
Sportspeople from Buenos Aires Province
Association football midfielders
Bolivian footballers
Bolivia international footballers
Bolivian expatriate footballers
Argentine footballers
Argentine expatriate footballers
Argentine people of Italian descent
Bolivian people of Italian descent
Argentine emigrants to Bolivia
Naturalized citizens of Bolivia
Club Atlético River Plate footballers
Córdoba CF players
Anorthosis Famagusta F.C. players
Club Bolívar players
Unión de Santa Fe footballers
Al-Arabi SC (Kuwait) players
O'Higgins F.C. footballers
Botafogo de Futebol e Regatas players
Oriente Petrolero players
Persebaya Surabaya players
Chilean Primera División players
Argentine Primera División players
Bolivian Primera División players
Cypriot First Division players
Segunda División players
Kuwait Premier League players
Liga 1 (Indonesia) players
2015 Copa América players
Argentine expatriate sportspeople in Bolivia
Argentine expatriate sportspeople in Chile
Argentine expatriate sportspeople in Spain
Argentine expatriate sportspeople in Cyprus
Argentine expatriate sportspeople in Brazil
Argentine expatriate sportspeople in Indonesia
Expatriate footballers in Bolivia
Expatriate footballers in Chile
Expatriate footballers in Spain
Expatriate footballers in Cyprus
Expatriate footballers in Kuwait
Expatriate footballers in Brazil
Expatriate footballers in Indonesia
Argentine expatriate sportspeople in Kuwait